Nicklas Mouritz Mouritsen (born 15 March 1995) is a Danish professional footballer who plays as a left-back for Danish 1st Division club FC Helsingør.

Club career

B.93
At the age of just 16, Mouritsen already got his first team debut for B.93 in the Danish 2nd Division. He played 10 league matches.

FC Nordsjælland
Mouritsen joined FC Nordsjælland in 2012, where he played 2 years on the youth teams. He was permanently moved to the first team squad in the summer 2014, at the age of 19.

On 24 September 2014, Mouritsen got his first team debut for FCN, when he played in a Danish Cup match against SC Egedal, who FCN lost 4-5. He got his Danish Superliga debut against Hobro IK on 28 February 2015, where he played the whole match.

FC Roskilde
On the last day of the summer transfermarket, Mouritsen got his contract with FCN terminated, and joined FC Roskilde. After playing for the club in two seasons, FC Roskilde announced on 3 June 2018, that Mouritsen alongside two other teammates, would leave the club this summer.

Lyngby BK
Mourtisen signed for Lyngby Boldklub on 11 July 2018. He left the club at the end of the season.

Return to FC Roskilde
On 7 September 2019, FC Roskilde announced that Mouritsen had returned to FC Roskilde. He left the club again at the end of the year. However, on 31 January 2020, he signed a new contract for the rest of the season.

Skive IK
On 15 October 2020, Mouritsen moved to Skive IK.

FC Helsingør
After only three months at Skive, Mouritsen joined fellow league club FC Helsingør on 28 January 2021.

References

External links
 Nicklas Mouritsen on Soccerway
 Nicklas Mouritsen on DBU

1995 births
Living people
Danish men's footballers
Danish Superliga players
Danish 1st Division players
Boldklubben af 1893 players
FC Nordsjælland players
FC Roskilde players
Lyngby Boldklub players
Skive IK players
FC Helsingør players
Denmark youth international footballers
Association football fullbacks
Footballers from Copenhagen